The Ojibway Nation of Saugeen is an Ojibwa First Nation in the Canadian province of Ontario. The Nation is located in the Thunder Bay District, approximately 20 kilometres northwest of Savant Lake.  In December, 2007, its total registered population was 206, of which the on-reserve population was 72. The community maintains strong ties with Mishkeegogamang First Nation

The Ojibway Nation of Saugeen's landbase consists of a 5,986 ha Ojibway Nation of Saugeen Indian Reserve.

Governance
Saugeen is governed by Chief Edward Machimity and three councillors: Eileen Keesic, Gladys Oombash and John Sapay.  Though a signatory to Treaty 3, Saugeen is not a member of the Grand Council of Treaty 3.  At one time Saugeen was member of the Windigo First Nations Council and the Nishnawbe Aski Nation, but withdrew from their memberships in 1995.  Ever since, the council has been a politically independent First Nation and is not a member of any of the Regional Chiefs Council or their Tribal Political Organizations.

External links
 AANDC profile
 First Nation unites to oust 'lifetime' chief

References

First Nations governments in Ontario
Ojibwe governments
Anishinaabe reserves in Ontario
Communities in Thunder Bay District
Nishnawbe Aski Nation